Mastigia is a monotypic moth genus of the family Erebidae described by Schaus in 1916. Its only species, Mastigia epitusalis, was first described by Francis Walker in 1859. It is known from Venezuela.

References

Herminiinae
Monotypic moth genera